Agatino Cuttone (born 18 February 1960) is an Italian professional football player and lastly was working as the manager of Fano.

Career
In 1979, he began his professional career for the Reggina. Also he played for the Torino, Catanzaro, Cesena. Perugia and Baracca Lugo.

In 1993, he started his coaching career in Cesena youth team. Since 1998, he coached the Marsala. Later on worked with Italian clubs. On December 17, 2013, became the new coach of San Marino Calcio in place of sacked Fernando José de Argila Irurita

References

External links

Profile at Soccerpunter.com

1960 births
Living people
Italian footballers
Italy under-21 international footballers
Association football defenders
Serie A players
Serie B players
Reggina 1914 players
Torino F.C. players
U.S. Catanzaro 1929 players
A.C. Cesena players
A.C. Perugia Calcio players
Italian football managers
A.C. Cesena managers
U.S. Catanzaro 1929 managers
Benevento Calcio managers
Modena F.C. managers
Expatriate football managers in San Marino
A.S.D. Victor San Marino managers
Footballers from Sicily
Sportspeople from the Province of Catania